The Lier entrenchment is south of Kongsvinger in Norway. It was the site of battles in 1808 and 1814.

See also
Franco-Swedish War

Military history of Norway